Idol on Quiz is a South Korean quiz variety television program that airs on KBS2. It often features a combination of native Korean and global idols from various groups as guests.

On November 6, 2020, it was confirmed that Jung Hyung-don will step down from the show after the episode on November 21 due to his hiatus. Kim Jong-min, originally a fixed guest of the show, will temporarily replace Jung as the co-host alongside Jang Sung-kyu. It was reported that the last recordings for the show were completed on November 11, and the show concluded on December 5.

Airtime

Cast

Hosts

Senior-dols

Overview
In each episode, guests are in two teams and three rounds of quizzes (two rounds from episode 7) are held. The team with more accumulated points wins, and the prize money will be donated, under the winning team's names, to the bursary (provided by King Sejong Institute) which helps people outside South Korea studying the Korean language and the Korean culture.

Current Quizzes

Former Quizzes

Episodes

2020

Notes

References

2020 South Korean television series debuts
2020 South Korean television series endings
Korean-language television shows
South Korean variety television shows